Adam David Long (born 11 November 2000) is a Manx footballer who currently plays for as a defender for Doncaster Rovers.

Club career
Born on the Isle of Man, Long began his career with local side St Georges before joining Wigan Athletic in 2017. He made his first-team debut during their EFL Trophy tie against Middlesbrough U23s in October 2017.

On 20 February 2020, Long signed for Notts County on an initial one-month loan deal.

On 17 July 2022, Long signed for newly relegated League Two club Doncaster Rovers for an undisclosed fee, signing a two-year deal.

Career statistics

References

External links

2000 births
Living people
People from Douglas, Isle of Man
Manx footballers
English footballers
Association football defenders
Wigan Athletic F.C. players
Notts County F.C. players
Doncaster Rovers F.C. players
English Football League players
National League (English football) players